Levinskaya is a rural locality (a village) in Ramenskoye Rural Settlement, Sheksninsky District, Vologda Oblast, Russia. The population was 40 as of 2002.

Geography 
Levinskaya is located 49 km north of Sheksna (the district's administrative centre) by road. Bolshaya Stepanovskaya is the nearest rural locality.

References 

Rural localities in Sheksninsky District